RED Music, stylized RED MUSIC, formerly RED Distribution, LLC (Relativity Entertainment Distribution) was a Sony-owned sales and marketing division that merged under The Orchard in 2017. RED previously handled releases for more than sixty independent record labels.

History 
Founded in 1979 as mainly a hard rock music distributor called Important Record Distributors, which originally distributed Metallica's first two LPs in the US, it became RED Distribution in the 1990s.

In October 1999, Sony Music Entertainment sold 80% of RED Distribution to Edel SE & Co. KGaA.

In March 2016, Sony announced the acquisition of Essential Music and Marketing. As part of this deal, a new company was launched, Red Essential, which is based at the Cooking Vinyl Group’s West London offices. The company is now located in Farringdon. This division had very little correlation to RED in the United States besides its name.

Acquisition 
On June 1, 2017, Sony Music announced that it would merge RED's British affiliate, Red Essential, into The Orchard. On June 5, Sony also included the American RED Distribution in its merger with The Orchard. The "RED" name will remain active as a new entity named RED MUSIC, which will provide marketing, label services, and joint ventures between Sony's labels and independent labels. As of September 2019, RED MUSIC was completely shuttered and consolidated into The Orchard.

References 

Record label distributors
Sony Music
Musical theatre record labels
Entertainment companies of the United States